Apatania incerta is a species of early smoky wing sedge in the family Apataniidae. It is found in North America.

References

Integripalpia
Articles created by Qbugbot
Insects described in 1897